Ōizumi may refer to:

 Ōizumi, Gunma, a town located in Gunma Prefecture, Japan
 Ōizumi, Yamanashi, a village located in Kitakoma District, Japan
 Yo Oizumi, Japanese TV personality and a stage actor